Martino Piazza, also Martino de' Toccagni, (1475-80 - 1523) was an Italian Renaissance painter.

Not much is known about Piazza's life except through his works. He worked in Lodi, Lombardy in conjunction with his brother Albertino Piazza who was also a painter. One work executed by both brothers Saint John the Baptist in the Desert can be found at the National Gallery. His son, Callisto Piazza (c. 1500–1562) was also a painter.

References

1470s births
1523 deaths
15th-century Italian painters
Italian male painters
16th-century Italian painters
Pupils and followers of Leonardo da Vinci